The turbopause, also known as the homopause, marks the altitude in an atmosphere below which turbulent mixing dominates. Mathematically, it is defined as the point where the coefficient of Eddy diffusion is equal to the coefficient of molecular diffusion. The region below the turbopause is known as the homosphere, where the atmosphere is well mixed for chemical species which have long mean residence times. Highly reactive chemicals tend to have variable concentration throughout the atmosphere, while unreactive species have more homogeneous concentrations. The region above the turbopause is the heterosphere, where molecular diffusion dominates and the chemical composition of the atmosphere varies according to chemical species and their atomic weight.

The Earth's turbopause lies near the mesopause, at the intersection of the mesosphere and the thermosphere, at an altitude of roughly 90 km (56 mi). Some other turbopauses in the solar system that are known include Venus' turbopause at about 130 – 135 km, Mars' at about 130 km, Jupiter's at roughly 385 km, and Titan's at around 800 – 850 km.

It was discovered by French scientists following the firing of two Véronique sounding rockets March 10th and 12th, 1959.

References

Specific

Atmospheric boundaries
Atmosphere of Earth